Frederick Bodmer (actually Friedrich Bodmer) (14 February 1894 – 2 January 1960) was a Swiss philologist and author of the popular book The Loom of Language.

Life

He wrote his PhD thesis in 1924 at University of Zurich on the topic Studies about a dialogue in Nathan by Gotthold Ephraim Lessing (Studien zum Dialog in Lessings Nathan). After that he taught in Europe and at University of Cape Town. Later he held a position within the Department of Modern Languages at Massachusetts Institute of Technology (MIT). He was succeeded in his position at MIT by Noam Chomsky in 1955.

Bibliography
Frederick Bodmer, The Loom of Language: A Guide To Foreign Languages For The Home Student, London: George Allen & Unwin, 1944 (Primers for the Age of Plenty, No. 3). Edited and arranged by Lancelot Hogben. .

References

External links 
 Speaking Volumes: Frederick Bodmer's The Loom of Language (a detailed British review from 1997)

Linguists from Switzerland
Swiss philologists
Academic staff of the University of Cape Town
MIT School of Humanities, Arts, and Social Sciences faculty
University of Zurich alumni
1894 births
1960 deaths
20th-century linguists
20th-century philologists